Double platinum is a type of music recording sales certification.

Double Platinum may also refer to:
 Double Platinum (film), a 1999 telemovie
 Double Platinum (Kiss album) (1978)
 Double Platinum (The Ten Tenors album) (2011)